Asociația Clubul Sportiv Șomuz Fălticeni, commonly known as ACS Șomuz Fălticeni or Șomuz Fălticeni, is a Romanian professional football club based in Fălticeni, Suceava County.

Șomuz Fălticeni was established in 2010, in order to assure the continuity of football in Fălticeni (second most populous city of Suceava County) after the dissolution of its predecessors, Foresta Fălticeni and Juventus Fălticeni. Șomuz Fălticeni promoted for the first time in its history to Liga III in 2018, after a failed attempt in 2016.

History 
History of professional football in Fălticeni started in 1954, along with the establishment of Avântul Fălticeni. Avântul was better known over years as Foresta Fălticeni and was by far the most successful club based in this town, reaching the 1967 Cupa României Final (first club that achieved a Romanian Cup final from the third tier) and also promoted in the top-flight in 1997. After promotion, Foresta was moved to Suceava and subsequently returned to Fălticeni, in 2003, but just to be dissolved after a short time. Foresta's legacy was carried on by various clubs in the following 7 years, but no one obtained notable results, among them, probably the best known was Juventus Fălticeni (est. 2002 and dissolved in 2008).

ACS Șomuz Fălticeni was established on 15 July 2010 and subsequently enrolled in the Liga V. The ascension of Șomuz was not a very fast one, after the club won Liga V in 2012, it succeeded in winning the 4th division only in 2016, but missed the promotion to Liga III after a tough promotion play-off against FC Bistrița.

Șomuz won again Liga IV Suceava in 2018, then obtain a 6–0 victory on aggregate against Flacăra Muntenii de Sus in the promotion play-off, promoting for the first time in the Liga III. In their first two seasons, fălticenenii were ranked 11th and 9th (out of 16).

Ground

Șomuz Fălticeni plays its home matches on Constantin Jamaischi Stadium in Fălticeni, Suceava County, with a capacity of 4,000 people (300 on seats). The stadium was renovated between 2017 and 2018 and now is the main stadium of the town. Foresta Fălticeni used to play its home matches on Nada Florilor Stadium, with a capacity of 10,000 people, on standing terrace. Nada Florilor Stadium had some structure problems since 1990s and after 2010 it was abandoned by the local authorities and Constantin Jamaischi Stadium was renovated instead.

Until 31 July 2020, Constantin Jamaischi Stadium was known as Tineretului Stadium, but it was renamed in the honor of Constantin Jamaischi former player of Rapid București, born in Fălticeni.

Honours
Liga IV – Suceava County
Winners (2): 2015–16, 2017–18
Liga V – Suceava County
Winners (1): 2011–12

Players

First team squad

Out on loan

Club Officials

Board of directors

Current technical staff

League history

References

External links

Association football clubs established in 2010
Football clubs in Suceava County
Liga III clubs
Liga IV clubs
2010 establishments in Romania